
Gmina Wohyń is a rural gmina (administrative district) in Radzyń Podlaski County, Lublin Voivodeship, in eastern Poland.

Villages
Gmina Wohyń contains the villages and settlements of Bezwola, Bojanówka, Branica Suchowolska, Kuraszew, Lisiowólka, Ossowa, Ostrówki, Planta, Suchowola, Świerże, Wohyń, Wólka Zdunkówka and Zbulitów Mały.

Neighbouring gminas
Gmina Wohyń is bordered by the gminas of Czemierniki, Drelów, Komarówka Podlaska, Milanów, Radzyń Podlaski and Siemień.

References
Polish official population figures 2006

Wohyn
Radzyń Podlaski County